Sidbury Castle is a substantial Iron Age hill fort near Sidbury in Devon, England.

References

Hill forts in Devon
Sidmouth